The 1948–49 Montreal Canadiens season was the 40th season in club history. The Montreal Canadiens were eliminated in the semi-finals against the Detroit Red Wings 4 games to 3.

Regular season
Bill Durnan set a long-standing modern NHL record between February 26 and March 6, 1949, when he amassed four consecutive shutouts, not allowing a goal over a span of 309 minutes, 21 seconds. This record was not surpassed until 2004, when Brian Boucher, then of the Phoenix Coyotes, broke it.

Final standings

Record vs. opponents

Schedule and results

Playoffs
The Canadiens would meet the Detroit Red Wings in the first round of the playoffs.

Detroit wins best-of-seven series 4 games to 3.

Player statistics

Regular season
Scoring

Goaltending

Playoffs
Scoring

Goaltending

Awards and records
 Bill Durnan, Vezina Trophy
 Bill Durnan, Goaltender, NHL First Team All-Star
 Glen Harmon, Defense, NHL Second Team All-Star
 Ken Reardon, Defense, NHL Second Team All-Star
 Maurice Richard, Right Wing, NHL First Team All-Star

Transactions

See also
1948–49 NHL season

References
Canadiens on Hockey Database
Canadiens on NHL Reference

Montreal Canadiens seasons
Montreal
Montreal